The Vanishing Frontier is a 1932 American pre-Code adventure film directed by Phil Rosen, written by Stuart Anthony, and starring Johnny Mack Brown, Evalyn Knapp, ZaSu Pitts, Raymond Hatton, Ben Alexander, J. Farrell MacDonald and Wallace MacDonald. It was released on July 29, 1932, by Paramount Pictures.

Cast 
Johnny Mack Brown as Kirby Tornell
Evalyn Knapp as Carol Winfield
ZaSu Pitts as Aunt Sylvia 
Raymond Hatton as Hornet O'Lowery
Ben Alexander as Lucien Winfield
J. Farrell MacDonald as Waco 
Wallace MacDonald as Captain Roger Kearney
George Irving as General Winfield
Joyzelle Joyner as Dolores 
Sam McDaniel as Whistlin' Zeke 
Soledad Jiménez as Mama Valdez

References

External links 
 

1932 films
American adventure films
1932 adventure films
Paramount Pictures films
Films directed by Phil Rosen
American black-and-white films
1930s English-language films
1930s American films